William McClellan "Mac" Thornberry (born July 15, 1958) is an American politician who served as the U.S. representative for Texas's 13th congressional district from 1995 to 2021. A member of the Republican Party, Thornberry represented the most Republican district in the United States by partisan voting index. The district covers the Texas Panhandle and stretched between the Oklahoma and New Mexico borders.

In September 2019, Thornberry announced that he would not run for reelection in 2020, and former Physician to the President Ronny Jackson was elected to succeed him.

Early life, education, and career

In the 1880s, Thornberry's great-great-grandfather Amos Thornberry, a Union Army veteran, moved to Clay County, just east of Wichita Falls.

Thornberry is a lifelong resident of Clarendon, 60 miles (97 km) east of Amarillo in the heart of the 13th. His family has operated a ranch in the area since 1881. He received his Bachelor of Arts in history from Texas Tech University in Lubbock. He then obtained his Juris Doctor from the University of Texas School of Law in Austin.

He served as a staffer to two other Texas Republican congressmen, Tom Loeffler and Larry Combest, and as deputy assistant Secretary of State for Legislative Affairs under Ronald Reagan before joining his brothers on the family ranch. Thornberry has called President Reagan "...a great man and a great president, ranking in the top tier of all of our chief executives." He also practiced law in Amarillo.

Thornberry is a member of the Council on Foreign Relations.

U.S. House of Representatives

Committee assignments
Committee on Armed Services (Ranking Member)

Republican Study Committee

From 2015 to 2019, Thornberry served as chairman of the House Armed Services Committee, the first Texan of either party to hold this position. The committee oversees the Pentagon, all military services, and all Department of Defense agencies, including agency budgets and policies.

Thornberry lost his 2009 bid to chair the full Armed Services Committee to Buck McKeon, R-Calif., who had more seniority. He served as vice chair of the full committee during McKeon's time as chairman. Since taking the committee gavel at the beginning of the 114th Congress, Thornberry has spearheaded a major Department of Defense acquisition reform effort that has received bipartisan and bicameral support from House Armed Services Committee Ranking Member Adam Smith (D-Wash.) and Senate Armed Services Committee Chairman John McCain (R-AZ).

Thornberry previously served on the United States House Permanent Select Committee on Intelligence.

On September 30, 2019 it was announced that Thornberry would not seek reelection in 2020.

Tenure and political positions
According to the National Journal Congressional Almanac, "In the House, Thornberry has compiled a solidly conservative voting record, though he has a pragmatic streak and is hardly the most ideological Republican in the Texas delegation. In keeping with his scholarly nature, his official website includes an essay explaining his philosophy and explaining his interest 'in continuing to push government to work smarter and more efficiently.'"

From January 1995 to July 2017, Thornberry missed 140 of 15,276 roll call votes, or 0.9%, fewer than the median of 2.2% among the lifetime records of representatives currently serving.

Foreign policy
Thornberry was critical of President Obama's 2010 arms control deal with Russia for precluding the use of nuclear weapons against non-nuclear nations. But he has been more pragmatic than other defense hawks. He served on a bipartisan commission in 2007 that drew up recommendations for winning the war in Iraq with both lethal and non-lethal approaches, such as diplomacy and foreign aid.

Taxation
On domestic issues, Thornberry has pressed for repeal of the estate tax and for tax credits to encourage production of oil in marginal wells.

Other
In 2010 Thornberry sponsored a bill to expand access to state veterans' homes to parents whose children died while serving in the military. That bill became law. In January 2011 he introduced a bill to help states set up special health care courts staffed by judges with expertise in the subject. The judges would serve as an alternative to juries that Republicans say are inclined to award unnecessarily large damage amounts in malpractice cases.

Term limits
Thornberry has consistently voted for term limits for U.S. Representatives, but does not intend to term-limit himself until a constitutional amendment is passed that imposes term limits on all members of Congress.

Agriculture and farm bill
Thornberry has pressed the house to pass a farm bill every five years in order to give farmers and ranchers more stability. In 2013 he voted for the five-year Farm Bill, which included annual cuts of $2 billion from food stamps, which would have been the largest change to food policy since 1996. The House did not pass the bill.

Smith-Mundt Modernization Act of 2012
In 2012 Thornberry introduced the Smith-Mundt Modernation Act of 2012 to amend the 1948 Smith-Mundt Act prohibiting the domestic dissemination of propaganda produced for foreign audiences.

Energy and climate change
In 2013 Thornberry introduced H.R. 2081, legislation to encourage production of all forms of domestic energy, including oil and gas, nuclear, and alternative energy and fuels.

Thornberry has voted to open the Outer Continental Shelf to oil drilling. He has voted to bar the EPA from regulating greenhouse gases. He has voted against tax credits for renewable electricity.

In July 2015, the President signed highway funding extension legislation into law. It included a provision based on a liquefied natural gas (LNG) excise tax bill, H.R. 905, that Thornberry introduced with Rep. John Larson (D-CT). The federal excise tax on LNG and diesel has been set at 24.3 cents per gallon. Because it takes 1.7 gallons of LNG to produce the same amount of energy as a gallon of diesel fuel, LNG is being taxed 70 percent higher than diesel. The new law "levels the playing field" by applying the excise tax to LNG and diesel based on the amount of energy each produces, which is how it is applied to Compressed Natural Gas and gasoline.

Defense Reform 
"In 2013, Thornberry led a long term effort to reform the Pentagon's acquisition programs. In 2016, he set acquisition reform as a key feature of the annual defense spending bill, including steps such as more experimentation with technology, encouragement of competition and clarification of intellectual property rights of Pentagon contractors."

Cybersecurity
In 2011, House Speaker John Boehner selected Thornberry to lead an initiative on cybersecurity to combat the growing national security and economic threat. The task force was composed of representatives from nine committees with jurisdiction over cyber issues. The panel recommended reforming a range of current laws, including the 2002 Federal Information Security Management Act, which governs government security programs.

In a 2012 column for Federal News Radio, Thornberry wrote, "If we can get an information sharing bill to the President, however, Congress should not consider their work done. We still have larger issues to grapple with, such as the role of the Department of Homeland Security and whether some industries will require a regulatory nudge to improve their network standards." That year, the House passed comprehensive cybersecurity legislation, but the Senate failed to act on any of it.

Drugs
In 2015, Thornberry introduced H.R. 1186, the Synthetic Abuse and Labeling Toxic Substances (SALTS) Act, which would make it easier for law enforcement officials to take action against synthetic drug manufacturers, distributors, and sellers by closing a loophole that makes it difficult to prosecute them if they label packages as "not intended for human consumption."

Interest group ratings
 In 2012, the American Conservative Union Ratings of Congress gave Thornberry a 96% rating for the year. He has a lifetime score of 95%.
 The National Right to Life Committee has consistently scored Thornberry at 100%.
 The American Family Association, Christian Coalition of America, and Family Research Council have all consistently given Thornberry a 100% rating on family and marriage issues.
 The National Rifle Association gave Thornberry a lifetime rating of 92% on 2nd Amendment and gun rights issues.
 Gun Owners of America gave Thornberry a score of 90% on 2nd Amendment and gun rights issues.
 The Disabled American Veterans and Vietnam Veterans of America have both given Thornberry a 100% score on veteran issues.
 Both the Fleet Reserve Association and Non Commissioned Officers Association have given Thornberry a 100% score military issues.

Political campaigns

Thornberry defeated Democratic Congressman Bill Sarpalius in the 1994 general election, a heavily Republican year nationwide. He polled 79,416 votes (55 percent) to Sarpalius's 63,923 votes (44 percent). Two years earlier in a much higher-turnout election, Sarpalius received nearly double the votes that he did in 1994. The 13th has always been a somewhat conservative district, but on paper had been made somewhat less Republican in the 1990s redistricting. For this reason, Thornberry's victory was regarded as an upset.

Thornberry would never faced another contest nearly as close as his initial one, and was reelected 10 times, never with less than 67 percent of the vote. While voters in this region began splitting their tickets as early as the 1940s, Democrats continued to hold most local offices well into the 1990s. Thornberry's win began a wave of Republican victories in this region, and it is now reckoned as one of the most Republican districts in the nation. In 2013 the Cook Partisan Voting Index rated it the most Republican district in the country (R+32).

Thornberry is only the third Republican to represent the district for a full term since Reconstruction. The previous Republican representatives were Robert D. "Bob" Price of Pampa (1967–75) and Beau Boulter of Amarillo (1985–89).

In the 2006 and 2008 elections, Thornberry handily defeated former intelligence officer and professor Roger Waun.

In the 2012 Republican primary, Thornberry overwhelmed his lone opponent, Pamela Lee Barlow, 47,251 votes (78 percent) to 13,643 (22 percent). In the general election, Thornberry bested (91 percent) Libertarian John Robert Deek of Denton and Green Party candidate Keith F. Houston of Canyon (there was no Democratic candidate).

In the 2014 Republican primary, Thornberry easily won re-nomination, with 45,097 votes (68 percent) to challengers Pamela Barlow's 12,438 (19 percent) and Elaine Hays's 8,860 (13 percent).

General election results

Later career

Business 
Thornberry joined the CAE USA board of directors, the National Defense Industrial Association Emerging Technologies Institute advisory board, and the Potomac Institute's board of regents after retiring from government service. In October 2022, Thornberry was appointed to the Defense Innovation Board.

References

External links
 
 
 

|-

|-

|-

1958 births
21st-century American politicians
American Presbyterians
Living people
People from Clarendon, Texas
Ranchers from Texas
Republican Party members of the United States House of Representatives from Texas
Texas Tech University alumni
United States Department of State officials